Sagatun Folk High School was a folk high school in Hamar, Norway.

The first of its kind in Norway, it was founded by Herman Anker and Olaus Arvesen in 1864. The school building was erected around 1865, and drawn by architect Emil Victor Langlet. The school was disestablished in 1892, having been headed by Arvesen from 1873 to 1878 and 1880 to 1892.

References 

Defunct schools in Norway
Folk high schools in Norway
Education in Hamar
Educational institutions established in 1864
Educational institutions disestablished in 1892
1864 establishments in Norway